Zirkuh Rural District is a rural district (dehestan) in Central District, Zirkuh County, South Khorasan Province, Iran. At the 2006 census, its population was 7,676, in 1,833 families.  The rural district has 33 villages.

References 

Rural Districts of South Khorasan Province
Zirkuh County